Caryl Rivers is an American novelist and journalist. Her 1984 novel Virgins was a New York Times Best Seller and sold millions of copies around the world. Her articles have appeared in major publications such as The Huffington Post, The New York Times, The Washington Post, The Boston Globe  and the Los Angeles Times.

Career
Rivers is a professor of journalism at Boston University. In 1979 she and historian Howard Zinn were among a group of Boston University faculty members who defended the right of the school's clerical workers to strike and were threatened with dismissal after refusing to cross a picket line. In 2008 Rivers was awarded The Helen Thomas Award for Lifetime Achievement which is awarded to an individual for a lifetime of contribution to the journalism profession.

Rivers is also the author of several other books including the 1986 sequel to Virgins, Girls Forever Brave and True, Slick Spins and Fractured Facts: How Cultural Myths Distort the News, Same Difference: How Gender Myths Are Hurting Our Relationships, Our Children, and Our Jobs and Camelot, a novel set during the Kennedy administration.

Publications
 Virgins 
 Girls Forever Brave and True
 Slick Spins and Fractured Facts: How Cultural Myths Distort the News
 Same Difference: How Gender Myths Are Hurting Our Relationships, Our Children, and Our Jobs<
 Camelot

Awards
 2008, The Helen Thomas Award for Lifetime Achievement

References

External links 

Caryl Rivers at The Huffington Post

Boston University faculty
20th-century American novelists
21st-century American novelists
American women journalists
American women novelists
20th-century American women writers
21st-century American women writers
Living people
Novelists from Massachusetts
20th-century American non-fiction writers
21st-century American non-fiction writers
Year of birth missing (living people)
American women academics